Stebník is a village and municipality in the Bardejov District in the Prešov Region of northeast Slovakia.

History
In historical records, the village was first mentioned in 1414.

Geography
The municipality lies at an elevation of 380 metres and covers an area of 20.533 km². It has a population of about 350 people.

References

External links
 

Villages and municipalities in Bardejov District
Šariš